Steven L. Mandel is an American anesthesiologist and advocate for the use of ketamine in the treatment of mental health.

Career 
Mandel is an anesthesiologist, who began his career working in cosmetic surgery offices in California. Following the death of a family member to suspected suicide, anxiety and PTSD he went on to co-found Ketamine Clinics Los Angeles, which he established in 2013. At his clinic, Mandel administers sub-anesthetic doses of ketamine for patients with chronic depression, suicidal ideation, via intravenous infusions. He has also advocated for scientific inquiry into other psychedelics and their potential use as mental health treatments. He is also the founder and first president of the American Society of Ketamine Physicians, Psychotherapists and Practitioners (ASKP3).

Education 
Mandel received a graduate degree in Psychology from the University of Cincinnati Graduate School, his MD from the University of Southern California Keck School of Medicine, and did residencies in anesthesiology at the Massachusetts General Hospital and UCLA.

References

American anesthesiologists
Living people 
University of Cincinnati alumni 
University of Southern California alumni
Year of birth missing (living people)